The Rodrigues pigeon or Rodrigues dove (Nesoenas rodericanus) is an extinct species of pigeon formerly endemic to the Mascarene island of Rodrigues. It is known from a subfossil sternum and some other bones, and the descriptions of Leguat (1708) and Julien Tafforet (1726).

Taxonomy
This bird was assigned to the genus Alectroenas, but this was erroneous. It is most similar to that of the ground doves (Gallicolumba) or to a miniature version of the sternum of an imperial pigeon (Ducula). If this similarity is not based on convergence, considering the evolutionary relationships of the dodo and the Rodrigues solitaire, the Rodrigues pigeon is quite possibly the closest relative of the Raphidae that was still alive in historic times. This does not mean that there is any close relationship between this bird and the didine pigeons, only that both derived, independently, from the same Indo-Asiatic lineage, which became extinct millions of years ago.

Two tarsometatarsi were attributed to this species. Today, they are believed to represent another taxon, closer to the Malagasy turtle dove (Nesoenas picturata), and thus the name Rodrigues turtle dove also refers to the present species.

Description
It was a bird the size of a tambourine dove and colored slate grey. Leguat and his companions took a fancy to these tame and confiding birds and had several dozen birds attending their outdoor table at mealtime to wait for scraps; they were especially fond of melon seeds. In 1693, the bird was found foraging on the island, but nested only on offshore islets which the rats that had been introduced at some time in the 17th century had not yet reached.

Behaviour
Leguat described its behaviour as follows:

Extinction
Tafforet's report is the last record of this species. It can be assumed to have gone extinct in the mid-18th century, when rats finally overran its nesting sites.

References

 Milne-Edwards, Alphonse (1873): Recherches sur la faune ancienne des Îles Mascareignes. Ann. Sci. Nat. Zool. (Paris) 5(19), Article 3, plate 12: figures 1, 1a, 1b, 1c. [Article in French] Note: Usually, the year of publication is given as 1874. However, although the volume was nominally of that year, it was already released in 1873.

Extinct birds of Indian Ocean islands
Nesoenas
Bird extinctions since 1500
Fauna of Rodrigues
Birds described in 1873
Extinct animals of Africa